Bāzārak is the provincial capital of Panjshir Province, in the Panjshir Valley of northeastern Afghanistan. It is a small city with a total population of 24,723  and has only three police districts (nahias). The total land area of Bazarak city is 9,122 hectares and there are 2,747 dwellings in the city. It comprises six villages: Khanez, Jangalak, Malaspa, Parandeh and Rahmankhel. The tomb of Ahmad Shah Massoud, known as the "Lion of Panjshir", is located in Bazarak.

History
During the Taliban rule of Afghanistan from 1996 to 2001, Bazarak and the Panjshir Valley region was a stronghold for the anti-Taliban Northern Alliance group of former mujahideen, led by town native Ahmad Shah Massoud.

Bazarak is classified as an Urban Village. Developed land such as housing, institutions and agriculture is clustered along the Panjshir River. Institutional land accounts for almost 30% of built-up land area, but the large majority of the total land is barren (84%).

Following the 2021 Taliban offensive, Bazarak became the only provincial capital not to fall under Taliban rule, becoming the headquarters of the National Resistance Front of Afghanistan. However, the Taliban claimed to have captured the city on 5 September 2021.

On 6 September 2021, Taliban senior spokesperson Zabiullah Mujahid claimed to have captured all of Panjshir, including the provincial capital, on Twitter, and pictures on social media showed Taliban fighters standing in front of the gate of the Panjshir provincial governor's compound. The Taliban hoisted their flag at a government building there. However, despite reports, the extent of the Taliban's control in Panjshir was disputed by the NRF spokesman and foreign relations head Ali Maisam Nazary, who claimed on 9 September 2021 that despite making "tactical" withdrawals from some areas, 60% of the province was still under control of the NRF. Tasnim News Agency reporters who visited the area on 11 September 2021 also confirmed the presence of not only Taliban fighters but also NRF fighters in Panjshir. Around late October, a subsequent visit by Radio Télévision Suisse and Journeyman Pictures into Bazarak would report an armed confrontation between the Taliban and the NRF occurring in an undisclosed location in the mountains surrounding Bazarak, reporting that resistance forces gained the upper hand, thus confirming that the NRF is still active near Bazarak and in Panjshir despite claims of inactivity by local Taliban officials.

On 15 August 2022, the one year anniversary since the fall of Afghanistan, the NRF launched an offensive in Panjshir, reportedly capturing seven villages in the Bazarak, Dara, Annaba, Shotul, Paryan, and Khenj districts, while surrounding Taliban fighters in several positions.

Climate
According to the Köppen climate classification system, Bazarak features a humid continental climate (Dsb) with warm, dry summers and cold, snowy winters. The annual precipitation is distributed mostly in the winter.

See also
 Panjshir Province

References 

Populated places in Panjshir Province
Provincial capitals in Afghanistan
Capitals in Asia